Saros cycle series 136 for solar eclipses occurs at the Moon's descending node, repeating every 18 years, 11 days, containing 71 events. All eclipses in this series occurs at the Moon's descending node.

This solar saros is linked to Lunar Saros 129.

Solar Saros 136 is for now producing the longest total solar eclipses. It produced the six longest total solar eclipses of the 20th century, three of them over seven minutes long. It also produced the longest total eclipse of the 21st century at 6 min 38.86 sec, and overall will produce the century's three longest total eclipses. Each eclipse is getting slightly shorter and this series will be surpassed in total eclipse length by Solar Saros 139 (whose eclipses are getting slightly longer) on May 11, 2078. Saros 136 in turn surpassed the previous longest-eclipse series, Saros 133, with its member event on May 18th, 1901. Saros 136 will ultimately produce a total of 44 total eclipses. It produced the most central total eclipse between the years 1209 and 2718 and the greatest magnitude of any eclipse since the year 540 on July 11, 1991. All eclipses in this series occurs at the Moon's descending node. Solar Saros 136 contains 71 events in which of 15 will be partial eclipses, 6 will be annular, 6 will be hybrid and 44 will be total.

Solar Saros 136 repeats every 18 years, 11 days, 8 hours. Solar Saros 136 contains 71 events in which of 15 will be partial eclipses and 56 will be umbral eclipses (6 annular, 6 hybrid, 44 total).

Solar Saros 136 

Occurred at the Moon's descending node, the same for Solar Saros 134 and 138.

Umbral eclipses
Umbral eclipses (annular, total and hybrid) can be further classified as either: 1) Central (two limits), 2) Central (one limit) or 3) Non-Central (one limit). The statistical distribution of these classes in Saros series 136 appears in the following table.

Events

Notes

External links
Saros cycle 136 - Information and visualization

Solar saros series